KRC Harelbeke is a Belgian football club based in Harelbeke, West Flanders. 

It is the result of the merger between the former club with the same name K.R.C. Zuid-West-Vlaanderen and K.S.V. Ingelmunster in 2002. The club was founded in 1930 as KSV Ingelmunster and played in Ingelmunster before they moved to Harelbeke in 2002. Since 2002, the club changed its name 3 times, from Sporting West Ingelmunster-Harelbeke in 2003, to Sporting West Harelbeke in 2007 and ultimately to KRC Harelbeke in 2016. The Stedelijk Forestiersstadion is the home of KRC Harelbeke and also of football club SWL Harelbeke.

References

External links 
 

Harelbeke
1930 establishments in Belgium
Sport in Harelbeke